Herbert Livingston Satterlee (October 31, 1863 – July 14, 1947) was an American lawyer, writer, and businessman who served as the Assistant Secretary of the Navy from 1908 to 1909.

Early life
Herbert Livingston Satterlee was born in New York City in 1863.  He was the son of George Bowen Satterlee (1833–1903) and Sarah Brady Wilcox (b. 1836). His siblings included Marion Satterlee and Richard T. Satterlee.

Through his paternal grandmother, Mary LeRoy (née Livingston) Satterlee (1811–1886), he is a member of the Livingston family and a direct descendant of Robert Livingston, the 1st Lord of Livingston Manor. His uncle was Henry Yates Satterlee (1843–1908), the Episcopal Bishop of New York.

Satterlee graduated with a B.S. from Columbia College in 1883, received his M.A. in 1884, as well was Columbia Law School with a Ph.D. and LL.B. law degree in 1885.

Career
Satterlee was admitted to the bar in New York in 1885, entering the office of Evarts, Choate and Beeman.  During the Spanish–American War, he volunteered for duty in the Navy, serving as a lieutenant in the Navy Department in Washington, D.C.

Before and after the war, Satterlee pursued a successful law practice, focused primarily on corporate law and commercial law. Together with George F. Canfield and Harlan Fiske Stone, he was a founding law partner of Satterlee, Canfield & Stone, a predecessor of the present-day firm Satterlee Stephens Burke & Burke LLP.

In 1908, President Theodore Roosevelt nominated Satterlee as Assistant Secretary of the Navy. Satterlee held this office from December 3, 1908, to March 5, 1909.  He served as President of The Union League Club from 1938 - 1939.

Satterlee authored several books, including a 1939 biography of his father-in-law entitled J. Pierpont Morgan: An Intimate Portrait.

Personal life
On November 15, 1900, he married Louisa Pierpont Morgan (1866–1946), the oldest daughter of J. Pierpont Morgan. In 1910, Satterlee and his wife purchased the Sotterley Plantation in Hollywood, Maryland. Together, they were the parents of two daughters:

 Mabel Morgan Satterlee (1901–1993), who married Francis Abbott Ingalls II (b. 1895), brother of Laura Ingalls, in 1925.
 Eleanor Morgan Satterlee (1905–1951), who married Milo Sargent Gibbs, the son of Milo Delavan Gibbs, in 1929. They divorced shortly after.

In failing health, Satterlee committed suicide with a pistol shot through his right temple at his apartment at 1 Beekman Place in Manhattan, New York City on July 14, 1947, at the age of 83.

References

External links
 
 Satterlee in c.1944 with actress Julia Marlowe

1863 births
1947 suicides
United States Assistant Secretaries of the Navy
Morgan family
People from Hollywood, Maryland
Suicides by firearm in New York City
Columbia Law School alumni
Columbia College (New York) alumni